Jenice Lee Ying Ha is a Malaysian politician from the Parti Rakyat Malaysia (PRM). Lee was also a one term Member of the Selangor State Legislative Assembly for the Teratai constituency from 2008 to 2013 representing Democratic Action Party (DAP) of Pakatan Rakyat (PR) coalition then.

Background
Lee is an atheist Malaysian Chinese. She graduated from Sydney University, major in Economics, Politics & International Relations. She started as a student's leader and she was the founding Vice Presidents of New Era College Students' Union. From a student activist she eventually joined NGOs such as Suara Rakyat Malaysia (SUARAM), the Human Rights NGO and eventually she joined political party; DAP.

Lee started her political involvement since 1999. During these period of times she actively participated in regional and international event such as IUSY conference and later she became a founding member of YPSEA. She was invited & sponsored by US Embassy for The International Leadership program; study visit on United Nations and also political study tour at Berlin that invited cum sponsored by FES; became a member of International Observer for Cambodia Election that sponsored by ANFREL at the age of 20.

Lee had received the "Outstanding Alumni Award" from INTI College.

Political career
Lee made her debut by contesting and winning the Selangor State Legislative Assembly seat of Teratai as a DAP candidate in the 2008 general election.

Lee defended her seat as an Independent by using "Tree" as her logo in the 2013 general election after her name was dropped by the DAP's 4 men select committee. Later DAP disciplinary chairman Tan Kok Wai announced she practised corruption and abuse of power. However, those allegations were not proven until today. Lee also faced many disagreements and needed to fend off political attacks from her former party DAP and other sects from the Pakatan Rakyat.

Lee finally announced she had joined Parti Rakyat Malaysia (PRM) in January 2018 and she was appointed as PRM Deputy President. In the subsequent 2018 general election in May, she contested Pandan parliamentary seat and Teratai state seat under PRM tickets but lost both.

Election results

See also

Teratai (state constituency)
Pandan (federal constituency)

References

External links
Jenice Lee 李映霞 Blog

1980 births
Living people
People from Selangor
Malaysian people of Chinese descent
Malaysian human rights activists
Parti Rakyat Malaysia politicians
Former Democratic Action Party (Malaysia) politicians
Independent politicians in Malaysia
Members of the Selangor State Legislative Assembly
Women MLAs in Selangor
University of Sydney alumni
21st-century Malaysian politicians
21st-century Malaysian women politicians